David Ackerman House is a historic house at 415 E. Saddle River in Ridgewood, Bergen County, New Jersey, United States.

It was built in 1750 and added to the National Register of Historic Places in 1983.

See also 
 National Register of Historic Places listings in Bergen County, New Jersey

References

Houses on the National Register of Historic Places in New Jersey
Houses completed in 1750
Houses in Bergen County, New Jersey
National Register of Historic Places in Bergen County, New Jersey
Ridgewood, New Jersey
New Jersey Register of Historic Places